Zachistka (lit. clearing operation) is an unofficial Russian military term for "building (room-to-room) clearing operations" (battle drill) featuring armed patrols and house-to-house searches. The term is mostly associated with, but not exclusive to, the "insurgency phase" of the Second Chechen War following the reinstatement of Russian peacekeeping operations in Chechnya. Several zachistka operations became notorious for their accused or confirmed human rights violations by Russian forces, including ethnic cleansing and pillaging, and the term zachistka is used in English exclusively to refer to these violations, particularly in Chechnya and the current conflict in Ukraine.

Notable operations

Chechnya

Novye Aldi

The Novye Aldi massacre was a massacre in which Russian federal forces summarily executed between 60 and 82 civilians in the Novye Aldi (Aldy) suburb of Grozny, in the course of a "mopping-up" operation conducted there on February 5, 2000. Numerous houses were also burned and civilian property was stolen in an organized manner and at least six women were raped.

Alkhan-Kala

The Alkhan-Kala operation was a week-long military zachistka by the Russian Spetsnaz special forces in Alkhan-Kala, Chechnya, south-west of the capital Grozny, from June 22, 2001 to June 28, 2001. The operation resulted in a major Russian victory, including the death of Arbi Barayev, a high-ranking Chechen separatist warlord, Islamist, and organized crime figure.

Tsotsin-Yurt

The Tsotsin-Yurt operation was a four-day zachistka by Russian Spetsnaz in Tsotsin-Yurt, Chechnya, starting on December 30, 2001. Officially, armed clashes broke out between Russian forces and Chechen separatists in the large village of Tsotsin-Yurt, south-east of Grozny. The outcome of the operation is disputed, and Russian troops were accused of widespread human rights violations.

Borozdinovskaya

The Borozdinovskaya operation was a zachistka by members of the Special Battalion Vostok, an ethnic Chechen unit of the Spetsnaz GRU, on June 4, 2005, in the Avar ethnic minority village of Borozdinovskaya, near Chechnya's border with Dagestan. At least 12 residents, 11 of which were Avar, were killed or "disappeared". Representatives of the Russian federal authorities expressed outrage over the incident, and the commander of the unit responsible was convicted.

Ukraine

Bucha 

After withdrawing from the village of Bucha outside of Kyiv, the Russian armed forces were reported to have systematically killed over 310 civilians. Over 40 victims were found in the street, shot in the head with their hands tied on their backs. Two mass graves, containing over 270 civilians were also found.

Others

Blagoveshchensk mass beating

The Blagoveshchensk mass beating is a term for a four-day zachistka operation by local OMON in Blagoveshchensk, Bashkortostan from December 10, 2004 to December 14, 2004. Around 500 to 1,500 people, totalling 2.5% of Blagoveshchensk's population, were arbitrarily detained by OMON special police and subject to physical abuse. The mass detentions, which even included adolescents and disabled people, were criticized as a collective punishment for Blagoveshchensk being one of the few towns in Bashkortostan to vote against Murtaza Rakhimov's third term as President of Bashkortostan.

See also
 Second Chechen War

References

Chechen–Russian conflict
War crimes in Russia